Ritu Shivpuri (born 22 January 1972) is an Indian actress and model, notable for her work in Hindi and Kannada cinema. Daughter of actors Om and Sudha Shivpuri, Ritu made her acting debut in a leading role in the 1993 film Aankhen, which was the highest grossing film of that year.

Filmography
 1993: Aankhen
 1995: Ham Sab Chor Hain
 1995: Rock Dancer
 1997: Aar Ya Paar
 1997: Bhai Bhai
 1997: Dongaata
 1999: Z
 1999: Nyaydevata
 1999: Kaala Samrajya
 2000: Hadh Kar Di Aapne
 2000: Glamour Girl
 2001: Lajja
 2002: Shakti: The Power
 2005: Elaan
 2005: Dubai Return
 2006: Ik Jind Ik Jaan

Television
 2016 24: India as Dr Sunny
 2017 Iss Pyaar Ko Kya Naam Doon 3 as Indrani Yash Narayan Vashishth
 2019 Nazar as Shalaka, Kohre ki rani
 2019 Vish  as Rudrama, Aliya's Aide, a socceress.
 2019 Karenjit Kaur - The Untold Story of Sunny Leone (Web series) as Neena, Jaspal Singh Vohra's love interest.
 2023 ''Class.

References

External links
 
 

1975 births
Living people
People from Rajasthan
20th-century Indian actresses
21st-century Indian actresses
Indian film actresses
Indian television actresses
Actresses in Kannada cinema
Actresses in Hindi cinema
Actresses in Punjabi cinema